The Romance of Hine-Moa is a 1927 British film set in New Zealand, directed and produced for Gaumont British by Gustav Pauli. It is now lost. The trade journal Bioscope said it was a "charming love story illustrating an old Maori legend, acted entirely by Maoris in beautiful and interesting native surroundongs".

Plot
The plot is the traditional story of the love of Hinemoa and Tutanekai from rival tribes. Pauli's version shifts the emphasis from Hinemoa's swim across the lake to meet her lover to Tutanekai's ordeal going through the Valley of Fire, the crater of an active volcano. Released in 1927, but New Zealand Prime Minister Gordon Coates attended a special showing by Gaumont in England on 16 December 1926.

Cast
 Maata Hurihanganui ... Hine-Moa
 Akuhato ... Tutanekai

References
New Zealand Film 1912-1996 by Helen Martin & Sam Edwards p38 (1997, Oxford University Press, Auckland)

External links
 
 1927 showing of film, newspaper article
 Collection 0208, Museum of Ethnography, Sweden, Pictures from the movie

1927 films
British romantic drama films
Films set in New Zealand
1927 romantic drama films
Films shot in New Zealand
Lost British films
Lost New Zealand films
New Zealand romantic drama films
New Zealand silent films
British silent feature films
British black-and-white films
Films about Māori people
1920s English-language films
1920s British films
Silent romantic drama films